Carl Hammerich (25 April 1888  – 21 March 1945) was a Danish naval officer and Admiral.

Hammerich was born in Aarhus, Denmark. He was the son of Louis Hammerich  (1859–1931) and  Eleonora Liisberg (1866–1961).  In 1921, he was married to Borghild Hammerich.  He started as a naval cadet in the Royal Danish Naval Academy during 1904 and was  promoted to Second Lieutenant in 1908. In 1940, he was appointed to Rear Admiral.

During World War II he participated in the Danish humanitarian aid to Norway, and was involved in the process leading to the White Buses operation.
Hammerich was arrested by German officials and died when the Royal Air Force bombed the Gestapo building in Copenhagen on 21 March 1945 (Operation Carthage).

References

1888 births
1945 deaths
20th-century Danish naval officers
Royal Danish Naval Academy alumni
People from Aarhus
Danish admirals
Danish civilians killed in World War II
Danish people who died in prison custody
Prisoners who died in German detention
Deaths by airstrike during World War II